This is a list of what are intended to be the notable top hotels by country, five or four star hotels, notable skyscraper landmarks or historic hotels which are covered in multiple reliable publications. It should not be a directory of every hotel in every country:

Vanuatu
Iririki Island Resort

Venezuela
Hotel Alba Caracas, Caracas
Hotel Europa
InterContinental Hotel Tamanaco
Isla Multiespacio

Vietnam

 Brinks Hotel, Ho Chi Minh City
 Caravelle Hotel, Ho Chi Minh City
 Hang Nga guesthouse, Da Lat
 Hilton Hanoi Opera Hotel, Hanoi
 Hotel Continental, Ho Chi Minh City
 Hotel Majestic, Ho Chi Minh City
 InterContinental Nha Trang, Nha Trang, Khánh Hòa Province
 Novotel Nha Trang, Nha Trang
 Rex Hotel, Ho Chi Minh City
 Sofitel Dalat Palace, Da Lat
 Sofitel Metropole, Hanoi
 InterContinental Danang Sun Peninsula Resort, Da Nang

References

V